Vlado Nedanovski (born 23 June 1985) is a retired Macedonian handball player.

Honours

Domestic competitions
 Macedonian Handball Super League:
 Winner: 2009–10,2012–13, 2016–17, 2017–18, 2018-19

 Macedonian Handball Cup:
 Winner: 2009, 2010, 2014, 2017, 2018

European competitions
 EHF Champions League
 Winner: 2016–17, 2018–19

Other competitions
 SEHA League:
 Winner: 2013–14, 2016–17, 2017–18, 2018–19

References

1985 births
Living people
Macedonian male handball players
People from Resen, North Macedonia